The Knag Burn Gateway is a gateway which was built into Hadrian's Wall some time after construction of the wall itself, generally acknowledged to be during the fourth century.

Location 
Knag Burn Gateway is located at the point where Hadrian's Wall crosses the Knag Burn, just to the east of Housesteads, between the fort and Turret 36B.  The burn itself passes beneath the wall via a culvert a few metres to the West of the gateway.

Description 
Knag Burn Gateway is one of the few gates through the wall that isn't part of a milecastle or fort.  The remains indicate that the structure consisted of a single-lane gateway, with guard-chambers on either side and a gate at each end, thus allowing two-stage controlled passage through the wall.  Professor I. A. Richmond suggested that the gateway was constructed to allow trade traffic through the wall some time in or after the fourth century.

The gateway was discovered in 1855 and excavated in 1936 and 1988.

Monument record

References

Hadrian's Wall
Roman sites in Northumberland
History of Northumberland